"Nagareboshi to Koi no Ame" is a song recorded by Japanese R&B singer Toshinobu Kubota for his sixteenth studio album, Gold Skool (2011).

Background

On July 13, 2011, "Nagareboshi to Koi no Ame" was released as the lead single as his sixteenth album Gold Skool. The song charted at number 15 on the Oricon Daily Singles and number 24 on the Oricon Weekly Singles chart, selling 2,727 copies in the first week of its release. "Nagareboshi to Koi no Ame" also chart at number 7 on Billboard Japan Hot 100 chart. It is noted that Kubota name checks several of his previous songs including "Candy Rain", "Goddess", "Sunshine Moonlight", "Niji no Grand Slam", "Never Turn Back", "Keep on Jammin'", "As One", and many other songs. The song also became the theme song for the NTV show "Refreshing". He also name check his previous albums including "Shake It Paradise", "Such A Funky Thang!", and "Sunshine, Moonlight".

Music video
Kubota also shot a music video for "Nagareboshi to Koi no Ame". The music video features Kubota in a room singing the song. The music video also uses music video clips from Kubota's previous music videos including "Ryuusei no Sadoru", "La La La Love Song", "Ahhhhh!", "Dance If You Want It", "Funk It Up", and "Love Rain (Koi no Ame)".

Track listing
CD Single
Nagareboshi to Koi no Ame
Polyrhythm (Name Remix)
Nagareboshi to Koi no Ame (Karaoke)

Limited edition DVD
Nagareboshi to Koi no Ame (Music video)

Charts and certifications

References

2011 singles
2011 songs
Toshinobu Kubota songs
Japanese songs
Songs written by Toshinobu Kubota
SME Records singles